This is the list of äkms of Pavlodar Region that have held the position since 1992.

List of Äkıms 

 Asyğat Jabağin (10 February 1992 – 18 January 1993)
 Danial Ahmetov (19 January 1993 – 19 December 1997)
 Ğalymjan Jaqianov (19 December 1997 – 21 November 2001)
 Danial Ahmetov (21 November 2001 – 11 June 2003)
 Qairat Nūrpeiısov (14 June 2003 – 30 September 2008)
 Baqytjan Sağyntaev (30 September 2008 – 20 January 2012)
 Erlan Aryn (20 January 2012 – 20 December 2013)
 Qanat Bozymbaev (20 December 2013 – 25 March 2016)
 Bolat Baqauov (25 March 2016 – 21 January 2020)
 Äbılqaiyr Sqaqov (21 January 2020 – present)

References 

Government of Kazakhstan